The 1926 Navy Midshipmen football team represented the United States Naval Academy in the 1926 college football season. The Midshipmen were coached by Bill Ingram in his first year and finished the season undefeated with a record of nine wins, zero losses and one tie (9–0–1). Although Alabama and Stanford have been named the 1926 national champion by most selectors, the 1926 Navy team was retroactively named as the national champion under Boand and Houlgate Systems. The team was ranked No. 2 in the nation in the Dickinson System ratings released in December 1926.

Schedule

References

Navy
Navy Midshipmen football seasons
College football national champions
College football undefeated seasons
Navy Midshipmen football